Reidar Kristoffer Børjeson (2 April 1931 – 5 September 2011) was a Norwegian figure skater. He competed at the 1952 Winter Olympics in Oslo. 

He was Norwegian champion in pairs in 1956, 1957, 1958 and 1959 together with partner Ingeborg Nilsson.

Results

Pairs
(with Bjørg Skjælaaen)

(with Nilsson)

References

1931 births
2011 deaths
Norwegian male pair skaters
Olympic figure skaters of Norway
Figure skaters at the 1952 Winter Olympics